The Honor 30 is a smartphone made by Huawei under their Honor sub-brand. It is a successor of the Huawei Honor 20 within the Huawei Honor series. On 15 April 2020, Honor completed its Chinese launch of the new Honor 30 series of smartphones, adding three new devices to its premium flagship lineup of devices. All the new phones are 5G capable and inherit the leading edge custom RYYB camera sensors. The Honor 30 is powered by the new Kirin 985 chipset, making this the first public showing of the new silicon. The Honor 30 Pro and Pro+ are powered by the well-known Kirin 990 5G chipset. The HONOR 30 Pro and Pro+ share a similar form factor to the Honor 30, but differ in terms of the industrial design, most notably because of the usage of a curved screen.

Specifications

Hardware 
The Honor 30 has a HiSilicon Kirin 985 octa-core processor, a Mali-G77 MP10 GPU, and a 4000 mAh non-removable battery. It has a 6.53-inch “all-view” display LCD screen.

The phone has four rear cameras including a 40-megapixel main camera, an 18-megapixel super-wide-angle camera, a 2-megapixel depth camera, and an 8-megapixel (Periscope telephoto), PDAF, OIS, 5x optical zoom

Software 
The honor 30 launched with Android 10 and Magic UI 3, without Google Play Services

References 

Huawei Honor
Mobile phones with multiple rear cameras
Mobile phones introduced in 2020
Mobile phones with 4K video recording